Villars is a commune in the Loire department in central France.

Villars is a former mining town.

Population

Twin towns
 Halberstadt, Germany, since 15 November 2003
 Torredembarra, Spain, since  2 September 1984

See also
Communes of the Loire department

References

Communes of Loire (department)